Monstera tuberculata is a species of plant in the genus Monstera native from Mexico south to Panama. Similar to Monstera dubia and a few other species in its genus, when young M. tuberculata has a shingle-like growth habit with leaves tightly pressed against the trunks of trees. As it matures, it has short-stemmed, oval leaves that lack the fenestrations of better-known species like Monstera deliciosa. Unusually for an aroid, its fruit hangs like a pendant.

Varieties 
There are two named varieties of Monstera tuberculata, separated by region and with different fruit morphology. 

 Monstera tuberculata var. brevinoda — from Nicaragua to Panama 
 Monstera tuberculata var. tuberculata – Mexico and Belize

References 

tuberculata
Plants described in 1939